Tommys Lake is a private 42-acre lake in Orion Township in Oakland County, Michigan, United States.

The lake is located off of Clarkston Road just east of Joslyn Road.

On the east shore of Tommys Lake is Camp Agawam. The camp was a Boy Scout camp founded in 1918 by the Boy Scouts of America's (B.S.A.) Clinton Valley Council. The 140-acre camp served as a summer camp and weekend campout location for countless scouts in Oakland County until being sold by the B.S.A.'s Michigan Crossroads Council to Orion Township in 2014. The camp and lake now host numerous events and activities throughout the year for both Scouts and community members alike.

Fish
Tommys Lake fish include perch, pumpkinseed sunfish and largemouth bass

References

Lakes of Oakland County, Michigan
Lakes of Michigan